George Meisner House is a rural mansion located approximately one mile north of the town of Shelton, Nebraska. The house was constructed in 1893-1894 and was built in the Queen Anne style.  In about 1915, during an "anti-Victorian" period, it was remodeled to more Neo-Classical styling.

It is a two-story frame house on a raised basement of Colorado limestone.  When completed it "was described as a residence that 'excels in every respect, any other in central Nebraska' (Shelton Clipper, Aug. 17, 1894)".  It was a home of George Meisner, a rancher, landowner, and businessman.

Besides the house, two other contributing buildings were included in the listing:  a two-story frame carriage barn and an adjacent one-story frame garage.

In 1988, the house was added to the National Register of Historic Places.

References

External links 

 Retrieved 2012-05-27.
Tales, at Buffalo County Historical Society

Houses in Buffalo County, Nebraska
Houses on the National Register of Historic Places in Nebraska
National Register of Historic Places in Buffalo County, Nebraska
Houses completed in 1894
Queen Anne architecture in Nebraska
Neoclassical architecture in Nebraska